Shiroor Matha is a Hindu monastery and one of the Ashta Mathas of Udupi. It was founded by Sri Vamana Tirtha at Shiroor village on the banks of the Suvarna River in Udupi, Karnataka He was a direct disciple of Sri Madhvacharya, the founder of the Dvaita school of Hindu philosophy. The latest swami, Lakshmivara Teertha, died on Thursday 19, July 2018.

The Lineage - Guru Parampara - of Shiroor Matha 
 Sri Madhvacharya
 Sri Vamana Teertha
 Sri Vasudeva Teertha
 Sri Punyasloka Teertha
 Sri Vedagamya Teertha
 Sri Vedavyasa Teertha
 Sri Vedavedya Teertha
 Sri Mahesha Teertha
 Sri Krishna Teertha
 Sri Raghava Teertha
 Sri Suresha Teertha
 Sri Vedabhushana Teertha
 Sri Srinivasa Teertha
 Sri Vedanidhi Teertha
 Sri Sridhara Teertha
 Sri Yadavottama Teertha
 Sri Lakshminarayana Teertha I
 Sri Vishwabhushana Teertha
 Sri Trailokyapavana Teertha
 Sri Lakshmikantha Teertha
 Sri Lakshminarayana Teertha II
 Sri Lakshmipathi Teertha
 Sri Lakshmidhara Teertha
 Sri Lakshmiramana Teertha
 Sri Lakshmimanohara Teertha
 Sri Lakshmipriya Teertha
 Sri Lakshmivallabha Teertha
 Sri Lakshmisamudra Teertha
 Sri Lakshmeendra Teertha(1926-1963)
 Sri Lakshmimanojna Teertha(1963-1971)(He renounced the peetha in 1971)
 Sri Lakshmivara Teertha(1971-2018)
 Sri Vedavardhana Teertha(2021)

See also
Udupi Sri Krishna Matha
Dvaita Vedanta
Dvaita literature

External links
Shiroor Math Official site

References 

Dvaita Vedanta
Ashta Mathas of Udupi